Barsboldia (meaning "of Barsbold", a well-known Mongolian paleontologist) is a genus of large hadrosaurid dinosaur from the early Maastrichtian Nemegt Formation of Ömnogöv', Mongolia.  It is known from a partial vertebral column, partial pelvis, and some ribs.

Discovery
In 1970, a Polish-Mongolian expedition near the Nemegt found the skeleton of an ornithopod and first assigned it to Saurolophus angustirostris. However, two Polish paleontologists, Teresa Maryańska and Halszka Osmólska, came to the conclusion that it was a lambeosaurine that had to represent a separate species. They named and described Barsboldia sicinskii based on the holotype specimen ZPAL MgD-1/110. The genus name honors the Mongolian paleontologist Rinchen Barsbold, while the species name honors Wojciech Siciński, the technician at the Warsaw Paleobiological Institute who prepared the skeleton. The holotype specimen, found in a layer of the Nemegt Formation dating to the early Maastrichtian, consisted of a partial skeleton consisting of nine back vertebrae, nine hip vertebrae, fifteen tail vertebrae, a left ilium, parts of the left and right pubis, several ribs, and a few fragments of the hind limbs, with the backbone largely articulated. The anterior and posteriormost portions of the skeleton were lost due to erosion.

Description
 
The most distinctive features of Barsboldia are found in the neural spines. These are very tall, particularly over the hips, and were described as second only to those of Hypacrosaurus altispinus and the tips of those found in the first few vertebrae of the tail are club-shaped, possibly a sign of old age.

Phylogeny
Maryańska and Osmólska described their new genus as a lambeosaurine (or hollow-crested duckbill), the first from the Nemegt Formation, although it lacked a skull. However, the sacrum has a keel along the bottom, a possible lambeosaurine feature, and the bones closely resemble those of Hypacrosaurus. With only one partial skeleton known, and no skull, the genus has been considered dubious or a possible lambeosaurine of uncertain placement. A newer study published in 2011 suggests that Barsboldia is actually a valid saurolophine.

The following cladogram was recovered in the 2011 phylogenetic analysis of Hadrosauroidea by Prieto-Márquez (the relationships within Lambeosaurinae and between basal hadrosauroids aren't shown).

Paleobiology
As a hadrosaurid, Barsboldia would have been a bipedal/quadrupedal herbivore, eating plants with a sophisticated skull that permitted a grinding motion analogous to chewing, and was furnished with hundreds of continually-replaced teeth. If it was a lambeosaurine, it would have had a hollow crest formed out of expanded skull bones containing the nasal passages, with a function relating to identification by sight and sound.

See also

 Timeline of hadrosaur research

References

Saurolophines
Late Cretaceous dinosaurs of Asia
Maastrichtian life
Nemegt fauna
Fossil taxa described in 1981
Taxa named by Teresa Maryańska
Taxa named by Halszka Osmólska
Ornithischian genera